Anzalas (died 552?) was an Armenian soldier and retainer of Narses who fought for the Eastern Roman  against the Ostrogoth kingdom in the Gothic Wars.

Anzalas slayed the Byzantine deserter Coccas, who was in service of the Gothic army after accepting the latter's duel before the Battle of Taginae.

See also
 Coccas
 Valaris

External links
 Valaris Issues a Challenge To Personal Combat. Illustration by Angus McBride (1996)


542 deaths
Duellists
6th-century Armenian people
Year of birth unknown
People of the Gothic War (535–554)
People killed in action